The Wintun are members of several related Native American peoples in Northern California.

Wintun may also refer to:

Wintun language
Wintun Glacier
WINTUN type of VPN network driver

See also 
 Wintu